CDKL5 is a gene that provides instructions for making a protein called cyclin-dependent kinase-like 5 also known as serine/threonine kinase 9 (STK9) that is essential for normal brain development. Mutations in the gene can cause deficiencies in the protein. The gene regulates neuronal morphology through cytoplasmic signaling and controlling gene expression. The CDKL5 protein acts as a kinase, which is an enzyme that changes the activity of other proteins by adding a cluster of oxygen and phosphorus atoms (a phosphate group) at specific positions. Researchers are currently working to determine which proteins are targeted by the CDKL5 protein.

The CDKL5 protein acts as a kinase, which is an enzyme that modulates the activity of other proteins by adding a phosphate group to specific positions. The CDKL5 protein regulates neuronal morphology through cytoplasmic signaling and by controlling gene expression, playing a crucial role in the development and maintenance of the nervous system.

Studies have shown that the CDKL5 protein interacts with various signaling pathways and plays a role in controlling neurotransmitter release, synaptic plasticity, and cell survival. The CDKL5 protein has also been shown to regulate the activity of genes involved in neuronal development and the formation of synaptic connections.

Researchers are actively working to better understand the role of the CDKL5 protein in brain development and the underlying mechanisms of CDKL5 disorders. Further studies are needed to determine which proteins are targeted by the CDKL5 protein, as well as to develop effective treatments for individuals affected by CDKL5 disorders.

Mutations 

Mutations in the CDKL5 gene cause CDKL5 deficiency disorder. CDKL5 Deficiency had been thought of as a variant of Rett's Syndrome due to some similarities in the clinical presentation, but it is now known to be an independent clinical entity caused by mutations in a distinct X-linked gene, and is considered separate from Rett Syndrome rather than a variant of it. While CDKL5 is primarily associated with girls, it has been seen in boys as well.  This disorder includes many of the features of classic Rett syndrome (including developmental problems, loss of language skills, and repeated hand wringing or hand washing movements), but also causes recurrent seizures beginning in infancy. Some CDKL5 mutations change a single protein building block (amino acid) in a region of the CDKL5 protein that is critical for its kinase function. Other mutations lead to the production of an abnormally short, nonfunctional version of the protein. At least 50 disease-causing mutations in this gene have been discovered.

Further confirmation that CDKL5 is an independent disorder with its own characteristics is provided by this study, published in April 2016, which concluded 'There were differences in the presentation of clinical features occurring in the CDKL5 disorder and in Rett syndrome, reinforcing the concept that CDKL5 is an independent disorder with its own distinctive characteristics'.  At one time, mutations in the CDKL5 gene were said to cause a disorder called X-linked infantile spasm syndrome (ISSX) or West syndrome. but this research established CDKL5 disorder as a distinct clinical entity.

Animal studies 

GSK3β inhibitors in Cdkl5 knockout (Cdkl5 -/Y) mice rescues hippocampal development and learning.  Likewise,  IGF-1 treatment in CDKL5 null mice restores synaptic deficits.

Therapeutics 

Aside from novel therapies with limited availability, anticonvulsants are the mainstay of treatment for most affected people. These have limited efficacy, pointing to a strong need to develop new treatment strategies for patients. Some treatments might show efficacy in a relevant proportion of patients, such as valproic acid, vigabatrin, clobazam or sodium channel blockers, as well as ketogenic diet

A clinical trial of Ataluren for nonsense mutations in CDKL5 and Dravet Syndrome has been announced. This same drug was approved by the UK's National Institute for Health and Care Excellence (NICE) for use in treating nonsense mutations in Duchenne muscular dystrophy.  This drug did not show any efficacy in patients with CDKL5 mutations. Finally a CDKL5 protein replacement therapy is in development.

Location 

The CDKL5 gene is located on the short (p) arm of the X chromosome at position 22. More precisely, the CDKL5 gene is located from base pair 18,443,724 to base pair 18,671,748 on the X chromosome.

ICD-10 
G40.42

See also 
 Cyclin-dependent kinase
 Rett syndrome
 West syndrome
 CDKL5 deficiency disorder

References

Further reading

External links 
 
 
 Cure CDKL5 Disorder resources for Families and Professionals - based in the UK
  International Foundation for CDKL5 Research - based in the US
 CDKL5 Forum - a professional forum to share current research on CDKL5 and to stimulate peer-group discussion
 CDKL5 Foundation Netherlands - CDKL5 Foundation based in holland for research, information and collaboration 

EC 2.7.11